Robert Cameron Beadle (October 19, 1883 - June 19, 1968) was the Secretary of the Men's League for Woman Suffrage of the State of New York in 1913 and was president of the National Association for Middle-Aged Employees in 1930. He was the grandson of Erastus Flavel Beadle.

References

People from New York (state)
1883 births
Year of death missing